Pepper root is a common name for several plants and may refer to:
 Cardamine concatenata
 Cardamine diphylla